Noralvis Aguilera Fergunzon (born 5 November 1982) is a Cuban volleyball player.

She competed with the Cuba women's national volleyball team at the 2003 FIVB World Grand Prix
She played for club team Camaguey.

References

External links 
 http://www.fivb.org/EN/volleyball/competitions/WorldGrandPrix/2003/Teams/VB_Player.asp?No=12428
 https://www.beaumontenterprise.com/news/article/Cuba-ir-225-con-novatas-a-Grand-Prix-de-752476.php
 http://www.fivb.org/EN/Volleyball/Competitions/Worldgrandprix/2003/photos/PhotoGallery.asp?No=019&Title=Nederlands%20vs.%20Cuba

1982 births
Living people
Cuban women's volleyball players
Liberos